This is a list of hoax commemorative plaques on permanent public display in locations around the world.

Europe

North America

See also
 Blue plaque, historical markers in the United Kingdom
 Anti-monumentalism (also: counter-monumentalism), a tendency in contemporary art that intentionally challenges every aspect (form, subject, meaning, etc) of traditional public monuments.
 List of hoaxes

References

Commemorative
Historical markers